Daryanne Lees Garcia (born 25 December 1986 in San Juan, Puerto Rico ) is a Cuban-Puerto Rican beauty queen who represented Cuba at Miss Grand International 2014 where she won the title.

Personal life
Lees was born in San Juan, Puerto Rico in December 1986 to a Puerto Rican mother and Cuban father. She later relocated to Miami, Florida.

Pageantry

Miss Puerto Rico Universe 2008
Daryanne competed at Miss Puerto Rico Universe 2008 under the name Lees Daryanne where she represented the Puerto Rican Community in the United States and was awarded Best National Costume. She previously won Miss Tampa USA 2008.  She also won the title of Miss Florida US International in 2009.

Miss Earth USA 2014
She is a candidate who took part in and became runner-up (Miss Eco-Tourism) in Miss Earth USA 2014 and held/joined a string of other contests like Miss Puerto Rico Teen, Miss Puerto Rico World 2006, Puerto Rico Model 2007, Miss Puerto Rico Universe 2008, Miss Florida USA 2009, Miss Florida US International 2009 before finally getting picked for the Miss Grand Cuba title.

Miss Grand International 2014
Lees Daryanne Garcia represented Cuba at the second Miss Grand International pageant on October 7, 2014, where she became the second winner in the pageant's history. She is the first woman to win an international beauty pageant title on behalf of Cuba in the history of international beauty pageants, Lees had traveled to Thailand, and South Sudan.

References

External links
 Miss Grand International

Miss Grand International winners
Living people
Cuban beauty pageant winners
1987 births
Puerto Rican people of Cuban descent